Scythris tubulella is a moth of the family Scythrididae. It was described by Bengt Å. Bengtsson in 2014. It is found in South Africa (Free State).

References

Endemic moths of South Africa
tubulella
Moths described in 2014